Sohar (also Romanized as Suḥār) is the capital and largest city of the Al Batinah North Governorate in Oman. An ancient capital of the country that once served as an important Islamic port town, Suhar has also been credited as the mythical birthplace of Sinbad the Sailor.

According to the 2010 census, Suhar's population was 140,006, making it Oman's fifth most-populated settlement. Described as an industrial town, the development of the Sohar Industrial Port during the 2000s has transformed it into a major Omani industrial hub.

History 
As the largest town in the region, it has been argued that Suhar is identified with the ancient town called 'Omanah' mentioned by Pliny the Elder in his Natural History. This settlement is believed to have given Oman its name.

According to Al-Tabari, in 893 or 894, during the Abbasid era, there was a dispute about who should rule Oman amongst local factions. A faction that approached the Abbasids was the Bani Sama, who were based in Al-Buraimi or Tawam, before moving to Sohar. Bani Sama also referred to themselves as the Wajihid Dynasty, and assumed leadership over the region. The present-day town of al-Buraimi is part of a historical region that Tabari referred to as 'Tawam', which nowadays also includes the adjacent UAE city of Al Ain.

By the 10th century, Sohar was one of the richest ports of the Persian Gulf. It was praised by Ibn Hawqal and Al-Maqdisi, who called it "flourishing, populous, beautiful, pleasant and delightful" and compared it favourably with the ports of China. Aloes, wood, bamboo, sandalwood and spices were brought from India and frankincense from Dhofar. The city was sacked by the Buwayhids in 971 and its trade went into decline. It also suffered from attacks by the merchants of Kish across the gulf. By the 13th century, it was part of the Kingdom of Hormuz. It was still an international port until at least the 16th century.

Portuguese 
In the early 16th century, Sohar was conquered by the Portuguese empire, to control the entrances of the Persian Gulf and trade in the Region. It was part of a web of fortress that the Portuguese had in the region, from Bahrain to Hormuz. It was drawn in the 17th century as it appears in António Bocarro's Book of Fortresses.

Industry 
Suhar is currently experiencing significant investment and economic shifts making it the focus of attention of many local and international investors and businessmen. This change is due to a series of investment projects and economic giant in Suhar industrial area where Port of Sohar is located. Established in 2002, the port has a strategic importance due to its nearness to the Strait of Hormuz. It is operated by Suhar Industrial Port Company (SIPC) and it is considered a world class port. With current investments exceeding $12 billion, it is one of the world’s largest port development projects. The port's container terminal, managed by Hutchison Ports handles majority of the container cargo of North Al Batinah region of the Sultanate.  

The Omani government has paid special attention to the city of Suhar, and placed it in the priorities of the future plan of the Omani economy in 2020. The goal of the Omani government is to make Suhar a business and industrial hub and help the Omani economy diversify away from oil. In order for the Omani economy to achieve this economic diversification, the Omani government is investing in a number of projects in the industrial area of Suhar. For example, it is investing more than $5 billion in the steel industry in which Oman aims to be one of the Gulf Cooperation Council's leading producers. In addition to the steel industry, there is also the industry of aluminium in Suhar industrial area. Sohar Aluminium Company was established in 2004 and it is considered one of the leading projects that play a major role in the sultanate’s economic diversification strategy.

Education 
Suhar has four high educational institutes:
 Sohar University – a private university in association with the University of Queensland.
 Sohar College of Applied Sciences – a government owned college.
 Oman Medical College – a private university in association with West Virginia University School of Medicine.
 International Maritime College Oman.

Suhar also has a number of international schools such as:
 Al Batinah International School (owned by Sohar Aluminium & ORPIC) – only IB SCHOOL.
 Sohar International School (S.I.S)
 Indian School Sohar.
 Pakistan School Sohar
Bengladesh School Sohar

Climate 
Suhar has a hot desert climate (Köppen climate classification BWh) with very hot summers and mild winters. Precipitation is low; more than half of the year's total rainfall falls in February, and summers are almost completely dry.

Parks 
Suhar has four main parks. The first is Suhar Park, located in Al Humbar. The second is the Silver Jubilee Park which is located in Sallan. The third is the Entertainment Park in Sanaiyyah. The fourth is in falaj alqabail.
There are many other parks, like Alminyal, Alsanqar, Alsuwaihra, Al-ons, Corniche park and Aluwaynat park.

The city also has the Sohar Regional Sports Complex.

Landmarks 
 Globe Roundabout 
 Sultan Qaboos Grand Mosque Sohar
 Sohar Gate
 Sohar Fort
 Sohar Coastal Market
 Bull Fighting Arena
 Handcrafts Market
 Fish Market
 Sohar Amusement Center.
 Sohar Beach 
 Silver Jubilee Park, Sallan

See also 

 Al Batinah Region
 List of cities in Oman
 Sohar Airport, the airport which serves the city

References

Further reading
Fiorani Piacentini, Valeria. "Sohar and the Daylamī Interlude (356–443/967–1051)". Proceedings of the Seminar for Arabian Studies 35 (2005): 195–206. 
Wilkinson, J. C. "Suhar (Sohar) in the Early Islamic Period: The Written Evidence". South Asian Archaeology (1979): 887–907.

External links 

 Omani Ministry of Foreign Affairs
 Overview at Encyclopedia Britannica

 
Populated places in Oman